Kulkeh Rash-e Sofla (also Romanized as Kūlkeh Rash-e Soflá) is a village in Baryaji Rural District, in the Central District of Sardasht County, West Azerbaijan Province, Iran. At the 2006 census, its population was 26, in 5 families.

References 

Populated places in Sardasht County